Landrum Creek is a  long 3rd order tributary to the Rocky River in Chatham County, North Carolina.

Course
Landrum Creek rises on the east side of Hickory Mountain in Chatham County, North Carolina and then flows southeast to join the Rocky River about 5.5 miles southwest of Pittsboro.

Watershed
Landrum Creek drains  of area, receives about 47.5 in/year of precipitation, has a wetness index of 410.26 and is about 60% forested.

References

Rivers of North Carolina
Rivers of Chatham County, North Carolina